Boianu Mare is a commune in Bihor County, Crișana, Romania with a population of 1,343 people. It is composed of five villages: Boianu Mare, Corboaia (Korbolyatelep), Huta (Hutatelep), Păgaia (Úsztató) and Rugea (Ruzsatag).

Sights 
 Wooden Church in Boianu Mare, built in the 18th century (1710), historic monument

References

Boianu
Localities in Crișana